Zagórze  (German Klein Heinersdorf) is a village in the administrative district of Gmina Lubrza, within Świebodzin County, Lubusz Voivodeship, in western Poland.

The village has a population of 130.

References

Villages in Świebodzin County